Aberdeen F.C. competed in the Scottish Football League Division Two and the Scottish Cup in season 1904–05.

Overview

Season 1904–05 was Aberdeen's second season and their first in Scottish League football. They failed to gain election to Division One in 1904, but successfully applied to join Division Two. The team abandoned their white jerseys for a new black and gold strip this season. The Pittodrie attendance record was broken in January when 16,000 spectators watched as Glasgow club Queen's Park visited Aberdeen in the Scottish Cup. In the league, Aberdeen finished seventh out of twelve clubs. In the cup, they won through to round three after wins over Queen's Park and Bathgate, but lost to Third Lanark at Cathkin Park. Tom Ruddiman finished as the club's top scorer with ten goals from 15 appearances.

Results

Scottish Division Two

Final standings

Scottish Cup

Squad

Appearances & Goals

|}

References

 

Aberdeen F.C. seasons
Aberdeen